Palfuria spirembolus is a spider species of the family Zodariidae.

Etymology
The epithet is a compound of Latin spira (spiral) and embolus, referring to the long large embolus.

Distribution
P. spirembolus is only known from Namibia near 18°E, and between 24°-28°S.

References

 Szüts, T. & Jocqué, R. (2001). A revision of the Afrotropical spider genus Palfuria (Araneae, Zodariidae). Journal of Arachnology 29(2):205–219. PDF

Endemic fauna of Namibia
Zodariidae
Spiders of Africa
Spiders described in 2001